Goon Affiliated is the fourth studio album by American rapper Plies. The album was released by Atlantic Records.

Background
Goon Affiliated was recorded between the fall of 2009 and the spring of 2010, set to be released just six months after Plies' previous album, Da Realist. As early as April 2009, Plies began assembling his "dream team" roster of rappers and producers for the project, immediately after the release of his single "Plenty Money". Plies explained that having his brother with him during the recording of the album was very important.

In an August 2009 interview with MTV.com, Plies discussed the meaning behind the track "First 48":

Additionally, Plies explained the title of the album:

The song "Look Like", which features rap verses from Young Jeezy & Fabolous is the first song on any of Plies' albums to feature other rappers.

Promotion
In June 2009, Plies allegedly threw $50,000 into a concert crowd in Atlanta, Georgia, in promotion of Goon Affiliated, as he performed his final single before Goon Affiliated, "Plenty Money". Later that month, Plies released his track "Becky". In April 2010, Plies announced his "Goon Affiliated 25 Day Giveaway Contest". Fans called a toll-free hotline from May 1 to May 25, 2010, and if Plies picked up the phone, the caller won a prize. Plies pledged to give away iPads, jewelry from his personal collection, as well as scholarships for college, health care payments, mortgage payments, and other big-ticket items.

Singles
"Becky", the first official single was released in June 2009 and peaked at number 32 on the Billboard Hot R&B/Hip-Hop Songs chart and number 14 on the Hot Rap Tracks chart, The second single was "She Got It Made", featuring Bei Maejor. It was released on March 5, 2010. The first promotional single was "Medicine", featuring Keri Hilson. It peaked at number 47 on the Billboard Hot R&B/Hip-Hop Songs and number 21 on the Hot Rap Tracks. This track didn't make the final product.

Reception

Commercial performance
The album debuted at number five on the US Billboard 200 chart with sales of 56,000 copies. Goon Affiliated stopped at number eighteen on the Billboard 200 the following week and sold 21,000 copies, bringing the sales total to 77,000. The album crossed the 150,000 sold mark on July 18, 2010 becoming the fourth of his albums to cross that benchmark.

Critical reception

The album was released to mixed reviews from music critics.  Edwin Ortiz of HipHopDX gave the album a 1.5 out of 5 stars. He disliked tracks "Bruh Bruh", "Rob Myself", "Awesome" and "Good Dick" while liking "Go Live", "Look Like" and "Kitty Kitty".

Track listing
The track listing was confirmed by AllMusic.

Personnel
Credits for Goon Affiliated adapted from AllMusic.

Plies - Executive Producer
Zaytoven - Producer
Chris Wheeler - Design
Bryan Tyson - Engineer
Troy Taylor - Composer, Producer, Engineer
Clinton Sparks - Composer, Producer
Glenn Schick - Mastering
J. R. Rotem - Producer
Gee Roberson - A&R
Brian Ranney - Package Production
Brian Pedersen - Assistant
Carlos Oyanedel - Assistant
Jean Nelson - A&R
Charles Moniz - Engineer
Mike Miller - Assistant
Graham Marsh (producer) - Engineer
Rob Marks - Mixing
Bei Maejor - Vocals, Vocal Producer
Ted "Touche" Lucas - Executive Producer

Ronnell "Big Gates" Levatte - Executive Producer
J.U.S.T.I.C.E. League - Producer
Patrick Hoelck - Photography
Dorian "DP" Hendricks - Vocal Engineer
Rob Gold - Photo Production
Kamau Georges - Producer
Friky Zeek - Producer
Patrick Fong - Art Direction, Design
Trina Edwards - A&R
Dynamic - Producer
Dunlap Exclusive - Producer
Anne Declemente - A&R
Otha "Vakseen" Davis III - Product Manager
Bob Croslin - Cover Photo
Chefton - Producer
Leslie Brathwaite - Mixing
Big Jones - Producer
BC - Producer
Kori Anders - Producer, Engineer
"RJ" Jacques - Technical Production

Charts

References 

2010 albums
Plies (rapper) albums
Albums produced by Polow da Don
Albums produced by J. R. Rotem
Albums produced by J.U.S.T.I.C.E. League
Albums produced by Fatboi
Albums produced by Troy Taylor (record producer)
Albums produced by Zaytoven
Atlantic Records albums